Paronychia argyrocoma, the silvery nailwort, is a plant species native to the eastern United States. It has a disjunct distribution, found in New England (Maine, New Hampshire, Vermont and Massachusetts) and the Appalachian Mountains of the Southeast (Georgia, Tennessee, Kentucky, North Carolina, Virginia, West Virginia and Maryland) but not from New York, New Jersey or Pennsylvania in between. The species grows on rocky sites at elevations of 200–1800 m.

Paronychia argyrocoma is a perennial herb with a woody caudex, forming mats covering significant areas of ground. Stems are prostrate to ascending, highly branched, up to 60 cm long. Leaves are leathery, lanceolate, up to 3 cm long. Flowers are borne in glomerules (clumps) of up to 25 flowers, each greenish-brown and covered with long silky hairs and spines on the calyx lobes.

References

argyrocoma
Flora of the United States